Mountain Park Concrete, Inc. is a concrete supplier based in Colorado, United States. The company supplies pre-cast concrete for septic tanks, manholes, wall panels, and other commercial and residential equipment. Mountain Park Concrete's plant in Granby, Colorado, was destroyed by Marv Heemeyer following a business dispute.

References

Building materials companies of the United States
Companies based in Colorado